Annanukku Jai may refer to:
 Annanukku Jai (1989 film), an Indian Tamil-language film
 Annanukku Jai (2018 film), a Tamil-language political satire film